Aron Sherriff (born 29 October 1985) is an international Australian lawn and indoor bowler.

Bowls career

World Championship
Sherriff won the gold medal in the triples with Mark Casey, Brett Wilkie and Wayne Ruediger during the 2012 World Outdoor Bowls Championship in Adelaide. He also won silver in the pairs with Leif Selby. Four years earlier he had won a silver and bronze at the 2008 World Outdoor Bowls Championship in Christchurch, New Zealand.

In 2016 he was part of the triples team with Barrie Lester and Mark Casey who won the silver medal at the 2016 World Outdoor Bowls Championship in Christchurch and he also won a bronze medal in the singles.

In 2020 he was selected for the 2020 World Outdoor Bowls Championship in Australia.

Commonwealth Games
He won the lawn bowls bronze medal at the 2014 Commonwealth Games. He won the Bowls Australia Awards Night as the  International Bowler of the Year for three consecutive years.

Further success came as part of the Australian team for the 2018 Commonwealth Games on the Gold Coast in Queensland where he took two silver medals in the Triples and in the Fours.

Asia Pacific
Sherriff has won six medals at the Asia Pacific Bowls Championships, including double gold in the triples and fours at the 2019 Asia Pacific Bowls Championships in the Gold Coast, Queensland.

Nationals
Sherriff has won three Australian National Bowls Championships titles and four Australian Opens.

References

Australian male bowls players
Bowls players at the 2014 Commonwealth Games
Bowls players at the 2018 Commonwealth Games
1985 births
Living people
Commonwealth Games medallists in lawn bowls
Commonwealth Games silver medallists for Australia
Commonwealth Games bronze medallists for Australia
Bowls World Champions
Medallists at the 2014 Commonwealth Games
Medallists at the 2018 Commonwealth Games